Goode Mountain is one of the major peaks of the North Cascades in the U.S. state of Washington.  Named for topographer Richard U. Goode of the USGS, it is the highest peak located in North Cascades National Park, between the Skagit River and Lake Chelan. It is the fourth-highest non-volcanic peak in Washington, and the twelfth-highest summit overall.

The mountain is made up of one main peak, and two smaller sub-peaks, The West Tower, and southeast peak. On the northeast side it accomplishes this rise in only 1.6 horizontal miles (2.6 km). However, due to its isolated location in the rugged North Cascades, it is not visible from any major road. Goode Glacier is also located on the northeast slopes of the mountain, in addition to many small snowfields located at higher elevations.

The mountain was first climbed in 1936 via the Southwest Couloir/Southeast Ridge Route, which is still the least technical route. More popular now is the Northeast Buttress, pioneered by well-known climber Fred Beckey and Tom Stewart on August 6, 1966. It involves some snow, possible ice, and rock climbing up to class 5.5. One of the most impressive routes is The Megalodon Ridge first ascent was September 6, 2007 by Blake Herrington and Sol Wertkin. A IV+ 5.10 route, along a ridge over  feet long, which took 12 hours to ascend by Blake Herrington and Sol Werkin.

Routes 

 Southwest Couloir/Southeast Ridge: first ascent July 5, 1936 by Wolf Bauer, Othello Philip (Phil) Dickert, Joe Halwax, Jack Hossack, George MacGowan
 Northeast Buttress IV 5.5: first ascent August 6, 1966 by Fred Beckey and Tom Stewart.
 Megalodon Ridge IV+ 5.10: first ascent September 6, 2007 by Blake Herrington and Sol Wertkin

See also
List of highest mountain peaks in Washington

References

External links
 

Mountains of Chelan County, Washington
Mountains of Washington (state)
Highest points of United States national parks
North Cascades of Washington (state)
North Cascades National Park